Liberta is a town located in Saint Paul Parish, on the island of Antigua in Antigua and Barbuda. It had a population of 2,560 in 2001.

It the fourth-largest town on Antigua. It is located in the southern island area, north of Falmouth Harbour and the port of Falmouth, to which it is connected by road.

History
Around the time of the 19th century British emancipation of slaves in British Antigua and Barbuda, a colonial plantation owner had financial troubles and was forced to sell off a part of her property in small lots.  The ex-slaves in the neighbourhood bought up all the small freeholds, as they desired to own land in perpetuity. “Liberta”, meaning liberty and honoring the freed people, became the settlement's name in 1835.  By 1842, a painted signboard near its border read: “The Village of Liberta”.

The new landowners immediately settled on the lots they had purchased, framed their houses, and cultivated their gardens.  Besides working on nearby plantations, income was sometimes also earned working as mechanics at Nelson's Dockyard at Falmouth Harbour.  Later on, their descendants also worked in other trades, such as tailors and shop keepers.

Education
Liberta Junior Secondary serves grades 1–9 in the village. There is a small steelpan orchestra there.

Demographics
Liberta has six enumeration districts.

Census Data (2011)

Enumeration Districts

 70800 Liberta 
 70901 Liberta-West_1 
 70902 Liberta-West_2 
 71000 Liberta-North Central 
 71100 Liberta-South Central 
 71200 Liberta-SouthWest

See also

References

Populated places in Antigua and Barbuda
Saint Paul Parish, Antigua and Barbuda
History of British Antigua and Barbuda